The statue of Jan Hendrik Hofmeyr in Church Square, Cape Town, is a sculpture of the South African journalist and politician Jan Hendrik Hofmeyr, affectionately known as "Onze Jan" (Our Jan). The statue was sculptured by Anton van Wouw. The statue was vandalized in April 2015 as part of a wider campaign against statues of colonial-era figures in South Africa. The statue's pedestal was covered with white material bearing the words "A black woman raised me".

References

Anton van Wouw
Buildings and structures in Cape Town
Outdoor sculptures in South Africa
Hofmeyr, Jan Hendrik
Vandalized works of art